The West Slavs are Slavic peoples who speak the West Slavic languages. They separated from the common Slavic group around the 7th century, and established independent polities in Central Europe by the 8th to 9th centuries. The West Slavic languages diversified into their historically attested forms over the 10th to 14th centuries.

Today, groups which speak West Slavic languages include the Poles, Czechs, Slovaks, and Sorbs. From the twelfth century onwards, most West Slavs converted to Roman Catholicism, thus coming under the cultural influence of the Latin Church, adopting the Latin alphabet, and tending to be more closely integrated into cultural and intellectual developments in western Europe than the East Slavs, who converted to Eastern Orthodox Christianity and adopted the Cyrillic alphabet.

Linguistically, the West Slavic group can be divided into three subgroups: Lechitic, including Polish, Kashubian, and the extinct Polabian and Pomeranian languages; Sorbian in the region of Lusatia; and Czecho–Slovak in the Czech lands.

History

In the Early Middle Ages, the name "Wends" (probably derived from the Roman-era Veneti) may have applied to Slavic peoples. However, sources such as the Chronicle of Fredegar and Paul the Deacon are neither clear nor consistent in their ethnographic terminology, and whether "Wends" or "Veneti" refer to Slavic people, pre-Slavic people, or to a territory rather than a population, is a matter of scholarly debate.

The early Slavic expansion reached Central Europe in the 7th century, and the West Slavic dialects diverged from common Slavic over the following centuries. The West Slavic tribes settled on the eastern fringes of the Carolingian Empire, along the Limes Saxoniae. Prior to the Magyar invasion of Pannonia in the 890s, the West Slavic polity of Great Moravia spanned much of Central Europe between what is now Eastern Germany and Western Romania. In the high medieval period, the West Slavic tribes were again pushed to the east by the incipient German Ostsiedlung, decisively so following the Wendish Crusade in the 11th century.

The early Slavic expansion began in the 5th century, and by the 6th century the groups that would become the West, East, and South Slavic groups had probably become geographically separated. One of the distinguishing features of the West Slavic tribes was manifested in the structure of the Pagan sanctuaries of the closed (long) type, while the East Slavic sanctuaries had a round (most often open) shape (see also: Peryn). Early modern historiographers such as Penzel (1777) and Palacky (1827) have claimed Samo's Empire to be first independent Slavic state in history by taking Fredegar's Wendish account at face value. Curta (1997) argued that the text is not as straightforward: according to Fredegar, Wends were a gens, Sclavini merely a genus, and there was no "Slavic" gens. He further states that "Wends occur particularly in political contexts: the Wends, not the Slavs, made Samo their king."

Other such alleged early West Slavic states include the Principality of Moravia (8th century–833), the Principality of Nitra (8th century–833), and Great Moravia (833–c. 907). Christiansen (1997) identified the following West Slav tribes in the 11th century from "the coastlands and hinterland from the aby of Kiel to the Vistula, including the islands of Fehmarn, Poel, Rügen, Usedom and Wollin", namely the Wagrians, Obodrites (or Abotrites), the Polabians, the Liutizians or Wilzians, the Rugians or Rani, the Sorbs, the Lusatians, the Poles, and the Pomeranians (later divided into Pomerelians and Cassubians). They came under the domination of the Holy Roman Empire after the Wendish Crusade in the Middle Ages and had been strongly assimilated by Germans at the end of the 19th century. The Polabian language survived until the beginning of the 19th century in what is now the German state of Lower Saxony.

Groupings 

Various attempts have been made to group the West Slavs into subgroups according to various criteria, including geography, historical tribes, and linguistics.

Bavarian Geographer grouping 
In 845 the Bavarian Geographer made a list of West Slavic tribes who lived in the areas of modern-day Poland, Czech Republic, Germany and Denmark:

Tribal grouping 

Lechitic group
Poles
Masovians
Polans
Lendians
Vistulans
Silesians
Pomeranians
Slovincians
Polabians
Obodrites/Abodrites
Obotrites proper
Wagrians
Warnower
Polabians proper
Linonen
Travnjane
Drevani
Veleti (Wilzi), succeeded by Lutici (Liutici)
Kissini (Kessiner, Chizzinen, Kyzziner)
Circipani (Zirzipanen)
Tollensians
Redarier
Ucri (Ukr(an)i, Ukranen)
Rani (Rujani)
Hevelli (Stodorani)
Volinians (Velunzani)
Pyritzans (Prissani)
Czech–Slovak group
Czechs
Moravians
Slovaks
Sorbian group
Milceni (Upper Sorbs)
Lusatian Sorbs (Lower Sorbs)

Linguistic grouping 

Lechitic group
Polans
Lendians
Silesians
Wends
Sorbs
Vistulans
Polabians
Obodrites
Slovincians
Kashubians
Gorals(Highlanders)
Czech–Slovak group
Czechs
Bohemians
Moravians 
Slovaks

Population

See also 
 Slavic peoples
 List of Slavic studies journals
 Czechization
 Polonization
 Slovakization
 East Slavs
 South Slavs
 Outline of Slavic history and culture

References

Bibliography
 
 
 
 
 

 
West Slavs